Juárez Celman Department is a  department of Córdoba Province in Argentina.

The provincial subdivision has a population of about 55,348 inhabitants in an area of 8,902 km², and its capital city is La Carlota, which is located around 502 km from Capital Federal.

Settlements
 Alejandro Roca
 Assunta
 Bengolea
 Carnerillo
 Charras
 El Rastreador
 General Cabrera
 General Deheza 
 Huanchilla
 La Carlota
 Los Cisnes
 Olaeta
 Pacheco de Melo
 Paso del Durazno
 Reducción
 Santa Eufemia
 Ucacha 

Departments of Córdoba Province, Argentina